The Palau national basketball team are the basketball side that represent Palau in international competitions. It is administered by the Palau Amateur Basketball Association.

Palau joined the International Federation of Basketball (FIBA) in 1988 and is Oceania's youngest member.

The team appeared at the 2005 South Pacific Mini Games.

Current roster
Scout Matsutaro
Perry Oiterong
Silverio Tumechub
Ziske Asanuma
Yutaka Gibbons Jr.
Makanani Ichiro
Javis Pedro
Reid Rikrik
Wallace Rikrik
JoJo Roberts
Sunshine Soalablai
Michael Williams

References

External links
2007 Palau Men's National Basketball Team
Palau News - Palau Basketball Federation

Men's national basketball teams
Basketball
Basketball in Palau
Basketball teams in Palau
1988 establishments in Palau